Benzofuran is the heterocyclic compound consisting of fused benzene and furan rings. This colourless liquid is a component of coal tar. Benzofuran is the "parent" of many related compounds with more complex structures. For example, psoralen is a benzofuran derivative that occurs in several plants.

Production
Benzofuran is extracted from coal tar. It is also obtained by dehydrogenation of 2-ethylphenol.

Laboratory methods
Benzofurans can be prepared by various methods in the laboratory. Notable examples include:
O-alkylation of salicylaldehyde with chloroacetic acid followed by dehydration (cyclication) of the resulting ether and decarboxylation.

Perkin rearrangement, where a coumarin is reacted with a hydroxide:

Diels–Alder reaction of nitro vinyl furans with various dienophiles:

Cycloisomerization of alkyne ortho-substituted phenols:

Related compounds
 Substituted benzofurans
 Dibenzofuran, an analog with a second fused benzene ring.
 Furan, an analog without the fused benzene ring.
 Indole, an analog with a nitrogen instead of the oxygen atom.
 Benzothiophene, an analog with a sulfur instead of the oxygen atom.
 Isobenzofuran, the isomer with oxygen in the adjacent position.
 Aurone
 Thunberginol F

References

 
IARC Group 2B carcinogens
Simple aromatic rings